The Association of Uganda Professional Women in Agriculture and Environment (AUPWAE) is a Ugandan NGO that brings together women professionals in the fields of agriculture and environment.  Its aim is to work with rural women at the grass-roots level to improve farm yield and food production.  AUPWAE is a member organization of the African Women Leaders in Agriculture and Environment Network (AWLAENET). It was founded in 1992 and registered as a non profit making organization in 1998.

Efforts
AUPWAE's main efforts involve:
 Technology transfer to rural women in both agricultural and environmental areas
 Professional development and education for women and girls
 Advocacy in the areas of
 Gender awareness
 Agricultural resource distribution
 Mentoring and career guidance
 Networking with similar agencies both within Uganda and across Africa

Partners
African Women's Development Fund
Makerere University-School of Forestry, Environment and Geographical Sciences
Uganda Water And Sanitation NGO Network
Centre for International Forestry Research
International Fund for Agricultural Development (IFAD)

References

External links
 
 AWLAENET homepage

Women's organisations based in Uganda
Agriculture in Uganda
Women in agriculture
Women's rights in Uganda